The 1988 Nations motorcycle Grand Prix was the fifth race of the 1988 Grand Prix motorcycle racing season. It took place on the weekend of 20–22 May 1988, at the Autodromo Dino Ferrari.

500 cc race report
Wayne Gardner on pole. Through the first turn, it was Eddie Lawson, Kevin Schwantz, Didier De Radiguès, Pierfrancesco Chili and Gardner.

At the end of the first lap, it was Lawson, De Radiguès, Schwantz, Gardner, Chili and Wayne Rainey.

Another few laps and it was Lawson, Gardner, De Radiguès, then a small gap to Rainey and Schwantz.

Lawson got a gap from a re-formed quartet behind. Christian Sarron went down at a chicane, forcing Kevin Magee and Niall Mackenzie off the track.

On the cool down lap there was a collision between Tadahiko Taira and Raymond Roche.

500 cc classification

References

Italian motorcycle Grand Prix
Nations
Nations